Holoptychiidae is an extinct family of lobe-finned fishes which lived during the Devonian period. At least one genus, Laccognathus, is thought to have been amphibious.

References

Porolepiformes
Prehistoric lobe-finned fish families
Devonian bony fish
Devonian first appearances
Devonian extinctions